The 1920–21 international cricket season was from September 1920 to April 1921.

Season overview

December

England in Australia

April

Australia in New Zealand

References

International cricket competitions by season
1920 in cricket
1921 in cricket